The Dog in the Manger is a 1996 Spanish film directed by Pilar Miró and based on the 1618 play of the same name by Lope de Vega.

Cast

Production 
The film was produced by Enrique Cerezo PC, Cartel S.A. and Lolafilms S.A. with the participation of RTVE and Canal+.

It was shot in Portuguese locations such as the Sintra National Palace, the Palace of Queluz, the Palace of the Marquises of Fronteira and the church of Setúbal.

Release 
Distributed by Columbia Tri-Star Films de España, the film was theatrically released in Spain on 27 November 1996 on 34 screens and grossed 43 million pesetas in its first week, placing third at the Spanish box office.

Awards and nominations

|-
| rowspan = "12" align = "center" | 1997 || rowspan = "12" | 11th Goya Awards || colspan = "2" | Best Film ||  || rowspan = "12" |  
|-
| Best Director || Pilar Miró || 
|-
| Best Actress || Emma Suárez || 
|-
| Best Actor || Carmelo Gómez || 
|-
| Best Adapted Screenplay || Pilar Miró, Rafael Pérez Sierra || 
|-
| Best Editing || Pablo del Amo || 
|-
| Best Original Score || José Nieto || 
|-
| Best Art Direction || Félix Murcia || 
|-
| Best Costume Design || Pedro Moreno || 
|-
| Best Cinematography || Javier Aguirresarobe || 
|-
| Best Makeup and Hairstyles || Esther Martín, Juan Pedro Hernández, Mercedes Paradela || 
|-
| Best Sound || Antonio Bloch, Carlos Faruolo and Ray Gillon || 
|}

See also 
 List of Spanish films of 1996

References
Citations

Bibliography

External links
 

1996 films
1996 comedy films
Spanish comedy films
1990s Spanish-language films
Spanish films based on plays
Films based on works by Lope de Vega
Films shot in Portugal
LolaFilms films
1990s Spanish films
Enrique Cerezo PC films